Transliteration of Libyan placenames is the process of converting Libyan placenames written in the Arabic alphabet into the Latin alphabet. Libyan places have, in most cases no common English name, so when they are referred to, they need to be transliterated, from Libyan Arabic or Standard Arabic. Over the decades, many systems have been used result in locations, which thus have multiple transliterations in circulation.

Background
Writing names of Libyan places in Latin alphabet is a confusing dilemma. In the past, the colonist Italians tried, despite the constraints of their language, to write these names as accurate as the local Libyans pronounce them, in Libyan Arabic, except for some places renamed by Roman, Greek, or Italian names, like (Al-Qubba-Giovanni Berta), (Shahat-Cirene), and (Sussa-Apollonia).

During World War II, the British used the Italian maps so they used the names almost as the Italians has already written it and so did the war's historians.

However, most Libyans were not acquainted of these previous experiments. Moreover, after the political change on September 1, 1969, any alphabet other than the Arabic one had been banned in writing any signs or tablets, so Libyan officials were uninterested in writing tablets or signs in foreign alphabet. People who were interested, either Libyan or foreign, tried to write the names after bringing them back to their Standard Arabic origin, sometimes far from reality. For example, in a place is known in Standard Arabic as “Ajdabia”, in Libya Arabic “Jdabia”, and the Italian wrote it “Agedabia”. Another place named in Standard Arabic. “Marsa Al Burayqa”, in Libyan Arabic, “Marsa El Breiga”, and the Italians wrote it Mersa Brega. A third example is “Al-Uqayla” in Standard Arabic “El Agheila” in Libyan Arabic, which was Italians wrote it.

There is no agreement on transliteration of Libyan placenames except for a few cities like Tripoli, Benghazi, and Tobruk.

List
Here is a list of selected Libyan cities and towns, showing how the places could be transliterated from Standard Arabic and Libyan Arabic. It shows also how the Italians had already transliterated the names to Italian alphabet. However, none of the choices has been suggested to be used alone.

Note that any (h) preceded by a vowel is lightly pronounced or silent (like in Darnah).

See also
Libyan Arabic
Romanization of Arabic
List of cities in Libya

Notes

References
El Hadi Mustapha Bulegma, & Saad Khalil Kezeiri (ed.), " Al Jamahiriya: Dirasa fil Jughrafia", Ad Dar al Jamahiriya lil nashr wa tawzee wa e'lan, Surt, Libya, 1995.

And Libya's maps at:
Rodolfo Graziani, “Libia Redenta”, Torella Editore; Napoli, 1948, pp. 336–337,& 352–353.
National Geographic Magazine, “Map of Africa”, a presented map in the February 1980 issue.

Geography of Libya
Transliteration
Libya geography-related lists
Arabic languages